Martin Lluelyn (1616–1682) (alias Llewellin) was a poet and physician of probable Welsh ancestry.

Origins
He was born 12 December 1616 the son of Martin Lluelyn of London. His Welsh origin is not certain, but is suggested by his surname and by the fact that his son George Lluelyn was described as "a Jacobitical, musical, mad Welsh parson" by the musical historian Dr Charles Burney (1726–1814).

Education
He attended Westminster School and Christ Church, Oxford, where he received the degrees of BA in 1640 and MA in 1643.

Career during Civil War
At the outbreak of the Civil War he sided with the Royalists and rose to the rank of captain. He was in  Oxford in 1648 when the Roundheads captured that city and fled to London, where he practiced as a physician, later in 1653 gaining from Oxford University the degree of MD and in 1659 was elected a fellow of the College of Physicians.

Restoration
Following the Restoration of the Monarchy in 1660 he composed poetry in honour of King Charles II (1660–1685), by whom he was appointed his personal Physician Extraordinary. In 1660 he was appointed principal of St. Mary Hall, Oxford. In 1664 he moved his residence to High Wycombe in Buckinghamshire and resumed his practice as a physician, and entered local civic life as mayor and a JP.

Literary career
As a student at Christ Church, Oxford he wrote various plays including one staged in 1661 during a visit to the university by King Charles II. However all his surviving published works are of poetry.

List of works
Men Miracles, with other Poems ("By M. Ll. St. of Christ Church in Oxon") (1646), reprinted in 1656, in 1661 and in 1679, as "Lluellin's Marrow of the Muses". The title-poem, which is a satire in Hudibrastic vein and metre upon the traveller's tales of Mandeville and others, but especially of Tom Coryate, is followed by smaller pieces, of which as an example a spirited and humorous fishing-song is given in Brydges's Censura, vol. x, page 131. Several of them were sufficiently popular to be thought worthy of insertion in the subsequent additions to Wit's Recreations (1640) (see Mennis, Facetiæ [1874], ii. 378).
Ode to Celia, which appeared in the collections of Ellis and Neale. Prefixed are commendatory verses by Edward Gray, William Cartwright and others.
Verses on the Return of King Charles II, James, Duke of York, and Henry, Duke of Gloucester (London, 1660, fol. 2)
Elegy on the Death of Henry, Duke of Gloucester (London, 1660, fol. 3)
Wickham Wakened; or the Quaker's Madrigall in Rhime Doggrel (1672, quarto), a diatribe against a rival practitioner of Wycombe, who was a quaker.

Lluelyn was also, like his friend Edward Gray, a contributor to Musarum Oxoniensium Charisteria (1638, quarto (Brydges, Restituta, i. 146)).

There is a copy of verses by him prefixed to Cartwright's Plays and Poems (1651), and he seems to have taken a leading part in the presentation of plays at Christ Church, as in the minor poems appended to his ‘Men Miracles’ (p. 80) is one addressed "to Dr. F[ell], Deane of Ch. Ch. ... when I presented him a Play". Another poem, probably written about 1640 and published with Men Miracles is addressed to "Lord B. on presenting him with a play".

He also wrote a verse in honour of the Royalist commander Sir Bevil Grenville (died 1643) slain at the Battle of Lansdown, as displayed inscribed on his mural monument erected in 1714 in Kilkhampton Church, Cornwall.

Marriage and children
Lluelyn married twice:
Firstly to a lady of unrecorded name, by whom he had children:
Martin Lluelyn (1652–1729), an officer of horse under King James II and appointed commissary-general of the forces in Portugal by Queen Anne in 1703.
Secondly on 5 August 1662 to Martha Long, daughter of George Long of Penn, Buckinghamshire, by whom he had children:
Richard Lluelyn, a student at the Inner Temple in 1693.

Death and burial
He died on 17 March 1681/2 and was buried at High Wycombe, in which parish church survives his epitaph written by his friend Rev. Isaac Milles (1638–1720), vicar of High Wycombe.

References

Sources
National Library of Wales, Dictionary of Welsh Biography, LLUELYN (or LLEWELLIN ), MARTIN ( 1616–1682 )
Dictionary of National Biography, 1885–1900, Volume 33, Lluelyn, Martin, by Thomas Seccombe (quoted verbatim in parts, out of copyright)

Welsh poets
1616 births
1682 deaths